Live at Sin-é is a live EP by Jeff Buckley.  The four-song EP was Buckley's first commercial recording and was released in November 1993 on Columbia Records. The EP captured Buckley, accompanying himself on a Fender Telecaster, in the Sin-é coffeehouse in New York City's East Village, the neighborhood he had made his home. An expanded version was released in 2003 as Live at Sin-é: (Legacy Edition).

Sin-é (pronounced shin-ay) is Irish for "That's it".

Track listing
"Mojo Pin" (Jeff Buckley, Gary Lucas) – 5:52
"Eternal Life" (Jeff Buckley) – 5:43
"Je n'en connais pas la fin (I Don't Know the End of It)" (Raymond Asso, Marguerite Monnot) – 5:00
"The Way Young Lovers Do" (Van Morrison) – 10:02

Legacy Edition Track listing

Year-end charts

References 

1993 debut EPs
Jeff Buckley albums
Live EPs
1993 live albums
Columbia Records live albums
Columbia Records EPs